Predeal-Sărari is a commune in Prahova County, Muntenia, Romania. It is composed of nine villages: Bobicești, Poienile, Predeal (the commune centre), Sărari, Sărățel, Tulburea, Tulburea-Văleni, Vitioara de Sus and Zâmbroaia.

References

Communes in Prahova County
Localities in Muntenia